Watershed is a South African pop rock band founded in Johannesburg in 1998.

History 
Most famous for their signature tune 'Indigo Girl' in 2002, Watershed became a 'natural' success when a German radio DJ heard the single whilst vacationing in South Africa and played it on the air in Germany. The band toured in June 2010 with MacStanley through Germany as part of the Rock Kick Off tour, which is hosted by German Music Television station Imusic1.

The band's song "Fine Way" was used in an advert for restaurant chain Wimpy in 2004.

In 2006 drummer Tulsa Pittaway left the group. He then joined Evolver (later renamed Evolver One) and has also released a solo album.

Hinds released his first solo album, Ordinary Boy, in 2013

Band members 
 Craig Warren Hinds (lead vocals/piano/acoustic guitar)
 Paul McIver (guitar & vocals)
 Howard Combrink (drums)
 Gideon Botes (guitar)
 Quintin Askes (bass)

South African discography 
This is Watershed's South African discography. They have released records in Germany and possibly elsewhere.

Singles 
"In the Meantime" (2002)
"Indigo Girl" (2002)
"Fine Way" (2003)
"Letters" (2006)
"Close My Eyes" (2006)
"Magical Energy" (2015)

Albums 
 In the Meantime, released in 2002 — achieved platinum
 Wrapped in Stone, released in 2003 — achieved gold
 Mosaic, released 10 October 2005 — achieved platinum
 Staring at the Ceiling, released on 4 August 2008 — achieved gold 
 A Million Faces (double CD, best of Watershed), released in 2010
 Watch the Rain, released in September 2015
 Harbour, released in November 2018

References

External links 
Official website

Musical groups established in 1998
South African rock music groups
South African musical groups